Vengeance Falls is the sixth studio album by American heavy metal band Trivium. It was released October 10, 2013, in Japan, October 14, 2013, in UK, and October 15, 2013, in US through Roadrunner Records and was produced by David Draiman, the lead vocalist of the band Disturbed. It is the second and last album to feature drummer Nick Augusto before his departure from the band in May 2014.

Background
In January 2013, bassist Paolo Gregoletto posted photos of the band working on their next studio release.  In one of the pictures, vocalist Matt Heafy was sitting next to David Draiman of Disturbed; leading to some speculation that he would play a part in the album's conception.  It was later confirmed via Gregoletto's Facebook that Draiman would in fact be the producer.

In an interview with Thrash Hits, David Draiman revealed that the album's title was Vengeance Falls.  Matt Heafy in particular was satisfied with Draiman's work on the album, calling him the "most hands-on producer" they've ever worked with. He went on to say that "Draiman helped me gain another four to six notes in my upper vocal range, which is something I never thought was possible ... He helped with every instrument, every song, helping create melodies – his ability to create melody is one of the most staggering things I've ever seen."

Release and promotion
The band performed the song "Brave This Storm" live on July 28, 2013 at Rock the City Bucharest in Romania and released the studio version three days later as a free digital download. Gregoletto stated in an interview that this song was just a teaser and the new album's first single was "Strife".

"Strife" was performed live for the first time on August 1, 2013 at the Resurrection Fest at Viveiro in Spain and it's available to stream via YouTube. Vengeance Falls became available for pre-order at their official website on August 20. The first single was available as an instant download with all pre-orders. Buyers would receive a digital copy of the album, downloadable on the day of release. "No Way to Heal" was released on September 30, the third song to be streamed.

Critical reception

Vengeance Falls has received mostly positive reviews from professional critics, but has proven controversial among die-hard fans, mostly because of the decision of hiring David Draiman as a producer. The Guardian stated "This is a proud and focused heavy metal album that eschews current trends in favour of great songs, massive grooves, blazing lead breaks and a disarming air of combative euphoria". Another positive review came from AllMusic, when Gregory Heaney commented "With a songwriting that emphasizes quality over quantity or complexity, the album feels more precise in its execution, with every moment expertly placed in order to serve the songs rather than show off the band's musicianship (which is, as always, considerable)".

One of the most recognized songs by the critics is "Strife". New Noise Magazine describes it as "an anthemic Shogun-esque track, with soaring riffs and a thick bass tone that captures Trivium at one of the high points of the album". Other impressive tracks are "Incineration: The Broken World" and "No Way to Heal", which is praised for its tempo changes and guitar solos ("The real kicker though is the intense solo at the end, by far one of the best in their catalogue of over one hundred songs").

A more mixed review came from Sputnikmusic staff reviewer Thompson D. Gerhart.  He gave the album a three out of five  "Vengeance Falls is an album with utility." and also stated "You must try to understand: Trivium really are the next Metallica, for better or worse."

Commercial performance
The album debuted at  No. 15 on the Billboard 200 albums chart on its release, selling 15,000 copies in the United States in its first week. It also debuted at No. 6 on Billboards Top Rock Albums, and No. 2 on Hard Rock Albums. The album has sold 69,000 copies in the United States as of September 2015.

Track listing

Personnel
Trivium
 Matt Heafy – lead vocals, guitars
 Corey Beaulieu – guitars, backing vocals 
 Paolo Gregoletto – bass, backing vocals
 Nick Augusto – drums, percussion

Production and design
 David Draiman – producer
 Andy Sharp and Jeremy Parker – engineering
 Colin Richardson and Carl Bown – mixing at Treehouse Studio Chesterfield, United Kingdom
 Ted Jensen – mastering at Sterling Sound, New York City
 Ashley Heafy – layout
 David Rath – A&R
 Brent Elliott White – artwork
 Travis Shinn – photography

Charts

References

2013 albums
Roadrunner Records albums
Trivium (band) albums